Lac de Remoray is a lake in the Doubs department of France. Located in the municipalities of Remoray-Boujeons and Labergement-Sainte-Marie, the lake is near Lac de Saint-Point. The lake and its surroundings were made a nature reserve in 1980.

Remoray